Roland Thöni (17 January 1951 – 4 April 2021) was an Italian alpine ski racer. A cousin of Gustav Thöni, Roland competed on the World Cup circuit during the 1970s.

Biography
Roland Thöni was born in Trafoi, a frazione of Stilfs (South Tyrol). His World Cup debut on 7 February 1971 was a top ten finish; he took seventh place in the slalom at Mürren, Switzerland.

His best year was 1972, which he opened with a bronze medal in the slalom at the Winter Olympics in Sapporo, finishing behind his cousin Gustav and Francisco Fernández Ochoa, the gold medalist from Spain. In mid-March 1972, Thöni also obtained his only two World cup victories; he won the slaloms at Madonna di Campiglio and Pra-Loup on consecutive days.

He did not reach the podium in the following World Cup seasons. His last international race was the downhill at the 1976 Winter Olympics, won by Franz Klammer.

World cup

All top 10 results

Victories

See also
 Italy national alpine ski team at the Olympics

References

External links
 

1951 births
2021 deaths
People from Stilfs
Italian male alpine skiers
Alpine skiers at the 1972 Winter Olympics
Alpine skiers at the 1976 Winter Olympics
Germanophone Italian people
Olympic medalists in alpine skiing
Medalists at the 1972 Winter Olympics
Olympic bronze medalists for Italy
Olympic alpine skiers of Italy
Alpine skiers of Fiamme Gialle
Sportspeople from Südtirol